This is a List of Privy Counsellors of the Kingdom of Great Britain and the United Kingdom appointed between the accession of King George I in 1714 and the death of King George III in 1820.

George I, 1714–1727

1714
James Lowther (1673–1755)
George Augustus, Prince of Wales (1683–1760)
Sir William Dawes, Bt (1671–1724)
James Stanhope (1673–1721)
Robert Walpole (1676–1745)
Hugh Boscawen (1680–1734)
The Earl of Stair (1673–1747)
Paul Methuen (1672–1757)
The Earl of Dorset (1688–1765)
The Earl of Uxbridge (1663–1743)
The Lord Carleton (1669–1725)

1715
Sir Peter King (1670–1734)
The Duke of Grafton (1683–1757)
The Earl of Galway (1648–1720)
The Earl of Derby (1664–1736)
The Earl of Lincoln (1684–1728)

1716
William Wake (1657–1737)
The Earl of Tankerville (1674–1722)
Sir Richard Temple, Bt (1675–1749)
Hon. Spencer Compton (1674–1743)
William Pulteney (1684–1764) (expelled 1731; re-admitted 1742)
John Aislabie (1670–1742)

1717
John Smith (1655–1723)
The Lord Torrington (1650–1719)
The Lord Cadogan (1670–1726)
The Duke of Newcastle (1693–1768)
The Earl of Westmorland (1680–1736)
The Earl of Berkeley (1680–1736)
Joseph Addison (1672–1719)
Sir Joseph Jekyll (1662–1738)
The Earl of Halifax (1685–1739)

1718
The Earl of Holderness (1681–1722)
James Craggs the Younger (1686–1721)
Richard Hampden (1674–1728)
Sir Nicholas Lechmere (1675–1727)
Sir John Pratt (1657–1725)

1719
Charles Wills (1666–1741)

1720
The Earl of Coventry (1676–1751)

1721
The Earl of Sutherland (1661–1733)
Sir George Byng, Bt (1663–1733)
The Lord Carteret (1690–1763)
The Duke of Chandos (1674–1744)
The Earl of Portmore (1656–1730)
The Lord Cornwallis (1675–1722)

1722
Sir Robert Sutton (1671–1746)

1723
The Earl of Godolphin (1678–1766)
Edmund Gibson (1669–1748)
The Earl of Findlater (1663–1730)

1724
The Duke of Ancaster and Kesteven (1686–1742)
Lancelot Blackburne (1658–1743)

1725
Sir Robert Raymond (1673–1733)
The Duke of Bolton (1685–1754)
Lord Finch (1689–1769)
Sir Robert Eyre (1666–1735)
Hon. Henry Pelham (1695–1754)

1726
The Lord Trevor (1658–1730)
The Duke of Queensberry (1698–1778)
The Earl of Marchmont (1675–1740)
The Viscount Lonsdale (1694–1751)

1727
The Earl of Chesterfield (1694–1773)
William Stanhope (1690–1756)

George II, 1727–1760

1727
The Earl of Scarbrough (1688–1739)
The Earl of Grantham (1672–1754)
The Earl of Sussex (1690–1731)

1728
Arthur Onslow (1691–1768)
Frederick Louis, Prince of Wales (1707–1751)

1729
The Earl of Burlington (1694–1753)

1730
The Lord Hervey (1696–1743)
The Lord Bingley (1676–1731)
Hon. Sir Conyers Darcy (1685–1758)
Sir William Strickland, Bt (1686–1735)
Horatio Walpole (1678–1757)

1731
The Duke of Devonshire (1698–1755)
The Lord De La Warr (1693–1766)
The Earl of Leicester (1680–1737)

1732
Sir Charles Wager (1666–1743)
Hon. Pattee Byng (1699–1747)

1733
The Duke of Atholl (1690–1764)
The Earl of Selkirk (1663–1739)
Sir Philip Yorke (1690–1764)
Charles Talbot (1685–1737)

1734
The Duke of Richmond (1701–1750)
The Earl of Pembroke (1693–1749)
The Earl of Essex (1697–1743)
The Earl Waldegrave (1684–1741)
Stephen Poyntz (1665–1750)

1735
The Duke of Montagu (1690–1749)
Sir Thomas Reeve (1673–1737)
The Earl FitzWalter (1672–1756)
Sir William Yonge, Bt (1693–1755)

1736
John Potter (1674–1747)
Sir John Willes (1685–1761)
The Earl of Cholmondeley (1703–1770)

1737
The Lord Monson (1693–1748)
Sir William Lee (1688–1754)

1738
The Earl of Abercorn (1685–1744)
John Verney (1699–1741)

1739
Sir John Norris (1660–1749)

1740
Lord Sidney Beauclerk (1703–1744)
The Lord Cornwallis (1700–1762)

1741
Thomas Winnington (1696–1746)
William Fortescue (1687–1749)

1742
The Marquess of Tweeddale (1695–1762)
Samuel Sandys (1695–1770)
The Duke of Ancaster and Kesteven (1714–1778)
William Pulteney (1684–1764)
Prince William, Duke of Cumberland (1721–1765)
George Wade (1673–1748)
Thomas Clutterbuck (1697–1742)
The Lord Gower (1694–1754)
The Lord Bathurst (1684–1775)
Hon. William Finch (1691–1766)

1743
Sir John Rushout, Bt (1685–1775)
Thomas Herring (1693–1757)

1744
The Lord Hobart (1693–1756)
George Dodington (1691–1762)
The Lord Edgcumbe (1680–1758)
The Duke of Bedford (1710–1771)

1745
–

1746
The Earl of Jersey (d. 1769)
William Pitt the Elder (1708–1778)
Henry Fox (1705–1774)

1747
Matthew Hutton (1693–1758)

1748
The Earl of Halifax (1716–1771)
Thomas Sherlock (1678–1761)
The Earl of Sandwich (1718–1792)
Sir John Ligonier (1680–1770)

1749
Sir John Strange (1696–1754)
The Duke of Marlborough (1706–1758)
Hon. Henry Bilson Legge (1708–1764)

1750
The Earl of Hyndford (1701–1767)
The Lord Anson (1697–1762)
Thomas Robinson (1695–1770)

1751
The Earl Harcourt (1714–1777)
The Earl of Holdernesse (1718–1778)
Marquess of Hartington (1720–1764)
The Earl of Albemarle (1702–1754)

1752
The Lord Berkeley of Stratton (1697–1773)
Sir George Lee (1700–1758)
The Earl Waldegrave (1715–1763)

1754
The Earl of Hillsborough (1718–1793)
George Grenville (1712–1770)
Sir Dudley Ryder (1691–1756)
Sir Thomas Clarke (1703–1764)
Sir George Lyttelton, Bt (1709–1773)

1755
The Duke of Bolton (1691–1759)
The Earl of Egmont (1711–1770)
The Earl of Rochford (1717–1781)
The Viscount Barrington (1717–1793)
The Earl Gower (1723–1806)

1756
Lord Hobart (1723–1793)
The Lord Raymond (1717–1756)
The Earl Temple (1711–1779)
The Viscount Bateman (1721–1802)
The Lord Mansfield (1705–1793)
Hon. Richard Edgcumbe (1716–1761)
The Viscount Falmouth (1707–1782)

1757
The Duke of Leeds (1713–1789)
Hon. Charles Townshend (1725–1767)
John Gilbert (1693–1761)
Sir Robert Henley (1708–1772)
The Earl of Thomond (1723–1774)

1758
Lord George Sackville (1716–1785) (expelled 1760; readmitted 1765)
Viscount Dupplin (1710–1787)
Thomas Secker (1693–1768)
The Marquess of Winchester (1718–1765)

1759
Hon. Edward Boscawen (1711–1761)
Robert Nugent (1702–1788)

1760
The Earl of Denbigh (1719–1800)
Welbore Ellis (1713–1802)

George III, 1760–1820

1760
Prince Edward, Duke of York and Albany (1739–1767)
The Earl of Bute (1713–1792)
The Earl of Huntingdon (1728–1789)
Hon. George Townshend (1724–1807)
Viscount Royston (1720–1796)

1761
The Earl of Albemarle (1724–1772)
The Earl of Shaftesbury (1711–1771)
Sir Francis Dashwood, Bt (1708–1781)
The Earl Talbot (1710–1782)
James Grenville (1715–1783)
The Marquess of Granby (1721–1770)
The Earl of Powis (1703–1772)
The Earl of Egremont (1710–1763)
Hon. James Stuart-Mackenzie (1719–1800)
Robert Hay Drummond (1711–1776)
Thomas Hayter (1702–1762)

1762
The Duke of Argyll (1693–1770)
Lord George Cavendish (1727–1794)
Sir Charles Pratt (1713–1794)
Richard Osbaldeston (1690–1764)
The Earl of Lichfield (1718–1772)
Sir John Cust, Bt (1718–1770)
Gilbert Elliot (1722–1777)
The Lord Tyrawley (1690–1773)
The Duke of Marlborough (1739–1817)
The Earl of Marchmont (1708–1794)
The Earl of Northumberland (1715–1786)
Hans Stanley (1720–1780)
Lord Strange (1717–1771)

1763
Humphry Morice (1723–1785)
Sir John Philipps, Bt (1700–1764)
The Earl of Shelburne (1737–1805)
Lord Charles Spencer (1740–1820)
James Oswald (1715–1769)
Richard Rigby (1722–1788)
The Earl of Ilchester (1704–1776)
The Earl of Hertford (1718–1794)
The Viscount Stormont (1727–1796)
The Lord Hyde (1709–1786)

1764
Richard Terrick (1710–1777)
Sir Thomas Sewell (1710–1784)
Prince William Henry, Duke of Gloucester and Edinburgh (1743–1805)

1765
The Viscount Weymouth (1734–1796)
Lord Frederick Campbell (1729–1816)
The Duke of Portland (1738–1809)
The Duke of Grafton (1735–1811)
The Marquess of Rockingham (1730–1782)
Hon. Henry Seymour Conway (1721–1795)
William Dowdeswell (1721–1775)
The Earl of Scarbrough (d. 1782)
The Earl of Ashburnham (1724–1812)
The Earl of Bessborough (1704–1793)
Viscount Villiers (1735–1805)
The Earl of Dartmouth (1731–1801)
The Viscount Howe (1726–1799)
The Lord Edgcumbe (1721–1795)
Thomas Pelham (1728–1805)
The Duke of Richmond (1735–1806)
The Earl Verney (1712–1791)

1766
The Duke of Dorset (1711–1769) 
The Earl of Breadalbane (1695–1782) 
Sir John Eardley Wilmot (1709–1792) 
Sir Charles Saunders (1713–1775) 
Isaac Barré (1726–1802) 
The Earl of Bristol (1721–1775) 
Prince Henry, Duke of Cumberland and Strathearn (1745–1790) 
Sir John Shelley, Bt (1730–1783) 
Lord North (1732–1792) 
Sir Edward Hawke (1705–1781) 
The Duke of Bolton (1720–1794)

1767
Thomas Townshend (1733–1800) 
George Onslow (1731–1814)

1768
Hon. Thomas Harley (1730–1804) 
The Lord Cathcart (1721–1776) 
Hon. Sir Joseph Yorke (1724–1792) 
Hon. Frederick Cornwallis (1713–1783) 
The Duke of Newcastle (1720–1794)

1769
Sir Fletcher Norton (1716–1789)
Sir James Gray, Bt (1708–1773)

1770
Hon. Charles Yorke (1722–1770)
The Duke of Somerset (1717–1792) 
The Lord Grantham (1738–1786) 
George Rice (1724–1779) 
The Earl Cornwallis (1738–1805) 
Hon. Henry Thynne (1735–1826)

1771
The Earl of Suffolk (1739–1779)
The Lord Apsley (1714–1794)
John Montagu, Viscount Hinchingbrook (1743–1814)
Sir William de Grey (1719–1781)
The Earl of Pomfret (1722–1785)
Sir Lawrence Dundas, Bt (1710–1781)

1772
Sir Jeffrey Amherst (1717–1797)
Sir Thomas Parker (1695–1784)

1773
Charles Jenkinson (1727–1808)
Sir William Lynch (1730–1785)
Sir John Goodricke, Bt (1708–1789)

1774
Sir William Meredith, Bt (1725–1790)
Jeremiah Dyson (1722–1776)

1775
The Duke of Chandos (1731–1789)
The Lord Lyttelton (1744–1779)

1776
The Lord Bruce of Tottenham (1729–1814)
The Duke of Montagu (1712–1790)
Henry Flood (1732–1791) (struck off 1781)

1777
William Markham (1719–1807)
The Earl of Carlisle (1748–1825)
Robert Lowth (1710–1787)
Charles Townshend (1728–1810)
Sir Sidney Stafford Smythe (1705–1778)
The Marquess of Carmarthen (1751–1799)

1778
The Lord Thurlow (1731–1806)

1779
The Duke of Ancaster and Kesteven (1756–1779)
Viscount Mountstuart (1744–1814)

1780
Viscount Beauchamp (1742–1822)
Sir Richard Worsley, Bt (1751–1805)
Alexander Wedderburn (1733–1805)
The Earl of Salisbury (1748–1823)
Charles Wolfran Cornwall (1735–1789)

1782
The Earl of Shannon (1728–1807)
The Duke of Dorset (1745–1799)
Lord John Cavendish (1732–1796)
John Dunning (1731–1783)
Hon. Charles James Fox (1749–1806) (expelled 1798; readmitted 1806)
Augustus Keppel (1725–1786)
Edmund Burke (1729–1797)
The Duke of Manchester (1737–1788)
The Earl of Effingham (1747–1791)
The Earl Ludlow (1730–1803)
Sir George Yonge, Bt (1731–1812)
Lord Ferrers of Chartley (1755–1811)
Viscount Chewton (1751–1789)
Lord Robert Spencer (1747–1831)
Hon. Sir William Howe (1729–1814)
Hon. William Pitt the Younger (1759–1806)
The Earl Temple (1753–1813)
Henry Dundas (1742–1811) (expelled 1805; readmitted 1807)
The Earl of Tankerville (1743–1822)

1783
The Duke of Rutland (1754–1787)
William Eden (1744–1814)
Hon. Charles Francis Greville (1749–1809)
The Earl of Cholmondeley (1749–1827)
Richard Fitzpatrick (1748–1813)
Frederick Montagu (1733–1800)
John Moore (1730–1805)
The Earl of Northington (1747–1786)
The Earl of Derby (1752–1834)
George Augustus Frederick, Prince of Wales (1762–1830)
James Grenville (1742–1825)
The Earl of Aylesford (1751–1812)
The Lord Walsingham (1748–1818)
William Grenville (1759–1834)

1784
The Earl of Chesterfield (1755–1815)
Lord George Lennox (1737–1805)
Lloyd Kenyon (1732–1802)
The Viscount Galway (1752–1810)
The Lord Mulgrave (1744–1792)
The Earl of Courtown (1731–1810)
Sir James Harris (1746–1820)
Lord Herbert (1759–1827)

1785
Thomas Orde-Powlett (1746–1807)

1786
John Foster (1740–1828)
John Beresford (1738–1805)
Sir John Parnell, Bt (1744–1801)

1787
John Hely-Hutchinson (1724–1794)
Hon. John Villiers (1757–1838)
Sir John Skynner (1724–1805)
Prince Frederick, Duke of York (1763–1827)
Alleyne Fitzherbert (1753–1839)
Beilby Porteous (1731–1808)

1788
Sir Richard Arden (1745–1804)

1789
The Earl of Chatham (1756–1835)
Sir Robert Murray Keith (1730–1795)
Sir William Wynne
Prince William, Duke of Clarence (1765–1837)
Henry Addington (1757–1844)
The Marquess of Graham (1755–1836)
The Earl of Westmorland (1759–1841)

1790
The Viscount Falmouth (1758–1808)
Hon. Dudley Ryder (1762–1847)
The Earl Gower (1758–1833)
The Lord FitzGibbon (1748–1802)

1791
Thomas Steele (1753–1823)
Viscount Parker (1755–1842)
Sir William Hamilton (1730–1803)

1792
The Lord Macartney (1737–1806)
Sir James Eyre (1734–1799)

1793
Sir Archibald Macdonald (1747–1826)
Lord Hobart (1760–1816)
The Earl of Mornington (1760–1842)
Lord Apsley (1762–1834)
Viscount Bayham (1759–1840)
Viscount Belgrave (1767–1845)
Viscount Stopford (1765–1835)
Sir Gilbert Elliot, Bt (1751–1814)

1794
Sylvester Douglas (1743–1823)
The Earl FitzWilliam (1748–1833)
The Earl Spencer (1758–1834)
William Windham (1750–1810)
Sir Morton Eden (1752–1830)
Viscount Milton (1746–1808)

1795
Hon. Thomas Pelham (1756–1826)
Sir George Howard (1718–1796)

1796
The Earl of Kinnoull (1751–1804)
Sir Grey Cooper (1726–1801)
The Duke of Roxburghe (1740–1804)

1797
Sir Joseph Banks (1743–1820)
Lord Charles Somerset (1767–1831)
Hon. Andrew Cochrane (1767–1833)
The Duke of Atholl (1755–1830)
Hon. John Trevor (1748–1824)
Sir Charles Grey (1729–1807)

1798
The Lord Cathcart (1755–1843)
The Earl of Harrington (1753–1829)
Sir William Scott (1745–1836)
Thomas Grenville (1755–1846)
Viscount Castlereagh (1769–1822)

1799
Sir William Fawcett (1728–1804)
Lord Hawkesbury (1770–1828)
Prince Edward, Duke of Kent and Strathearn (1767–1820)
Prince Ernest Augustus, Duke of Cumberland and Teviotdale (1771–1851)
The Earl of Elgin (1766–1841)
Sir John Scott (1751–1838)
Isaac Corry (1755–1813)
The Lord Lavington (1738–1807)

1800
George Canning (1770–1827)
William Dundas (1762–1845)
The Lord Whitworth (1752–1825)

1801
William Stuart (1755–1822)
Sir John Mitford (1748–1830)
The Earl of St Vincent (1735–1823)
Charles Philip Yorke (1764–1834)
The Lord Arden (1756–1840)
The Earl of Hardwicke (1757–1834)
Viscount Lewisham (1755–1810)
Sir William Grant (1752–1832)
Charles Abbot (1757–1829)
Thomas Wallace (1768–1844)
Charles Bragge (1754–1831)

1802
William Wickham (1761–1840)
George Rose (1744–1818)
Charles Long (1761–1838)
Prince Adolphus, Duke of Cambridge (1774–1850)
The Lord Ellenborough (1750–1818)
Sir John Borlase Warren, Bt (1753–1822)
Sir Charles Morgan, Bt (1726–1806)
John Smyth (1748–1811)

1803
John Hiley Addington (1759–1818)
George Tierney (1761–1830)
Hon. Thomas Maitland (1759–1824)
Nathaniel Bond (1754–1823)

1804
Hon. Sir Arthur Paget (1771–1840)
Sir Evan Nepean, Bt (1751–1822)
Sir James Mansfield (1733–1821)
The Earl of Winchilsea and Nottingham (1752–1826)
Lord George Thynne (1770–1838)
The Lord Mulgrave (1755–1831)
William Drummond (1770–1828)
Charles Arbuthnot (1767–1850)
Lord John Thynne (1772–1849)
Lord Granville Leveson-Gower (1773–1846)
Prince Augustus, Duke of Sussex (1773–1843)

1805
John Hookham Frere (1769–1846)
John Sullivan (1749–1839)
Nicholas Vansittart (1766–1851)
Reginald Pole Carew (1753–1835)
Charles Manners-Sutton (1755–1828)
The Lord Barham (1726–1813)
The Earl of Powis (1754–1839)

1806
Prince William Frederick, Duke of Gloucester and Edinburgh (1776–1834)
The Earl of Moira (1754–1826)
The Earl Temple (1776–1839)
Lord Henry Petty (1780–1863)
Hon. Charles Grey (1764–1845)
Hon. Charles James Fox (1749–1806)
Viscount Morpeth (1773–1848)
Lord John Townshend (1757–1833)
The Lord Erskine (1750–1823)
Richard Brinsley Sheridan (1751–1816)
The Duke of Bedford (1766–1839)
The Earl of Carnarvon (1741–1811)
The Earl of Carysfort (1751–1828)
Lord Ossulston (1776–1859)
The Lord St John of Bletso (1759–1817)
William Elliot (1766–1818)
George Ponsonby (1755–1817)
Sir John Newport, Bt (1756–1843)
The Earl of Donoughmore (1756–1825)
The Marquess of Douglas and Clydesdale (1767–1852)
The Earl of Lauderdale (1759–1839)
The Lord Holland (1773–1840)
Sir John Anstruther, Bt (1753–1811)

1807
Hon. Spencer Perceval (1762–1812)
Hon. Robert Dundas (1771–1851)
Sir James Pulteney, Bt (1755–1811)
The Duke of Richmond (1764–1819)
The Lord Teignmouth (1751–1834)
Hon. Sir Arthur Wellesley (1769–1852)
The Lord Manners (1756–1842)
The Earl of Clancarty (1767–1837)
Hon. Henry Pierrepont (1780–1851)
Hon. Richard Ryder (1766–1832)

1808
Hon. Edward Venables (1757–1847)
The Earl of Mount Edgcumbe (1764–1839)
The Viscount Strangford (1780–1855)

1809
Sir John Nicholl (1759–1838)
John Randolph (1749–1813)
Hon. William Wellesley-Pole (1763–1845)
The Viscount Palmerston (1784–1865)
Charles Manners-Sutton (1780–1845)
The Lord Sheffield (1735–1821)
Hon. Henry Wellesley (1773–1847)

1810
Sir John Sinclair, Bt (1754–1835)

1812
The Marquess of Winchester (1764–1843)
The Earl of Yarmouth (1777–1842)
John McMahon (c.1754–1817)
Viscount Jocelyn (1788–1870)
Robert Liston (1742–1836)
Lord Charles Bentinck (1780–1826)
Lord George Beresford (1781–1839)
William FitzGerald (1783–1843)
Robert Peel (1788–1850)
Hon. F. J. Robinson (1782–1859)

1813
Sir Thomas Plumer (1753–1824)
William Howley (1766–1848)
Sir Vicary Gibbs (1751–1820)

1814
Hugh Elliot (1752–1830)
Sir Alexander Thomson (1744–1817)
Warren Hastings (1732–1818)
The Earl of Shaftesbury (1768–1851)
The Earl of Aberdeen (1784–1860)
The Lord Stewart (1778–1854)
Lord Binning (1780–1858)
William Huskisson (1770–1830)
William Sturges Bourne (1769–1845)

1815
William Adam (1751–1839)
The Lord Amherst (1773–1857)

1816
Edward Thornton (1766–1852)
Sir Henry Russell, Bt (1751–1836)

1817
Sir Richard Richards (1752–1823)
Sir George Hill, Bt (1763–1839)
John Beckett (1775–1847)
Sir Benjamin Bloomfield (1768–1846)
The Earl Talbot (1777–1849)
John Leach (1760–1834)
Sir William à Court, Bt (1779–1860)

1818
George Henry Rose (1770–1855)
Sir Charles Abbott (1762–1832)
Sir Robert Dallas (1756–1824)

1819
Charles Grant (1778–1866)
Sir Samuel Shepherd (1760–1840)

References

1714